This article is about the 2007 season of Whitehaven.

National League One table

2007 Season players

2007 Signings/Transfers
Gains

Losses

Re-Signings

References

Whitehaven RLFC season